The following is intended to be the complete discography of the progressive rock British band Supertramp. Over the years they have released eleven studio albums, four live albums, five compilation albums and 28 singles.

Albums

Studio albums

Live albums

 Live, 1997 was previously released as It Was the Best of Times in April 1999. It offers 13 highlights from a rejuvenated group captured as part of their hundred-date It's About Time world tour. The group's first foray into live work in almost a decade was organized to promote a comeback LP Some Things Never Change, which had been released in March 1997. The tracks that make up this live collection were extracted from the Royal Albert Hall shows from September 1997.

Compilation albums

Video albums

Singles

Music videos

Non-official albums (bootlegs)
 1976: Live in Boston
 School / Bloody Well Right / Sister Moonshine / Ain't Nobody But Me / Hide in Your Shell / Poor Boy / The Meaning / Just a Normal Day / Asylum / Dreamer / Rudy / If Everyone Was Listening / Another Man's Woman / Lady / Encores: Home Again / Crime of the Century
 1979: Milwaukee Arena '79
 School / Ain't Nobody But Me / The Logical Song / Goodbye Stranger / Sister Moonshine / Oh Darling / Hide in Your Shell / From Now On / Child of Vision / Even in the Quietest Moments / A Soapbox Opera / Asylum / Give a Little Bit / Bloody Well Right / Breakfast in America / Dreamer / Rudy / If Everyone Was Listening / Another Man's Woman / Fool's Overture / Encores: Two of Us / Crime of the Century
 1983: Munich 1983
 Crazy / Ain't Nobody But Me / Breakfast in America / Bloody Well Right / It's Raining Again / Put on Your Old Brown Shoes / Hide in Your Shell / Waiting So Long / Give a Little Bit / From Now On / The Logical Song / Goodbye Stranger / Dreamer / Rudy / Fool's Overture / Encores: School / Crime of the Century
 1985: Aliens in Texas – Dallas '85
 Still in Love / Bloody Well Right / From Now On / Rudy / Cannonball / Asylum / Ain't Nobody But Me / Goodbye Stranger / I Just Wanna Make Love to You / Better Days / Crime of the Century
 1988: Madrid 1988
 You Started Laughing / It's Alright / Not The Moment / Ain't Nobody But Me / Better Days / Bloody Well Right / Cannonball / Breakfast in America / From Now On / Free as a Bird / An Awful Thing to Waste / Asylum / Rudy / Where I Stand / Oh Darling / Just Another Nervous Wreck / The Logical Song / Goodbye Stranger / Encores: School / Crime of the Century
 2002: One More for the Road Tour – Mannheim
 School / Slow Motion / Over You / Bloody Well Right / Tenth Avenue Breakdown / Cannonball / Sooner or Later / Free as a Bird / Downstream / Asylum / Give a Little Bit / From Now On / Take the Long Way Home / Another Man's Woman / The Logical Song / Goodbye Stranger / Encores: Broken Hearted / Rudy / Crime of the Century
 2010: 70-10 Tour
 You Started Laughing / Gone Hollywood / Put on Your Old Brown Shoes / Ain't Nobody But Me / Breakfast in America / Cannonball / Poor Boy / From Now On / Give A Little Bit / Downstream / Asylum (occasionally) / Rudy / It's Raining Again / Another Man's Woman / Take the Long Way Home / Bloody Well Right / The Logical Song / Goodbye Stranger / Encores: Don't You Lie to Me (occasionally) / School / Dreamer / Crime of the Century

References

External links
Unofficial discography of Supertramp
Supertramp on charts

Rock music group discographies
Discographies of British artists